Mehregan Rural District is a rural district (dehestan) in the Central District of Parsian County, Hormozgan Province, Iran. At the 2006 census, its population was 3,091, in 688 families. The rural district has 8 villages.

References 

Rural Districts of Hormozgan Province
Parsian County